Gordon W. Corwin (June 17, 1900 - December 29, 1968) served in the California State Assembly for the 73rd district from 1935 to 1941 and during World War I he served in the United States Army.

References

United States Army personnel of World War I
Republican Party members of the California State Assembly
20th-century American politicians
1900 births
1968 deaths